Yuri Ivanovich Drozdov (19 September 1925, Minsk – 21 June 2017, Moscow) was a high-level Soviet and Russian security official. He was a recipient of the Order of Lenin (1981). He oversaw the KGB's Illegals Program from 1979 to 1991. Drozdov led Special Operation Storm-333, which started the Soviet–Afghan War.

Early life
Yuri Ivanovich was born in Minsk to the former Anastasia Kuzminichna Pankevich (1898-1987) from Lepel, Belarus, and Ivan Dmitrievich Drozdov (1894-1978).

His mother, Anastasia Kuzminichna, was a Belarusian typist with the English paper factory in Pereslavl-Zalessky, and then, after the Russian Civil War, in the secretariat of the then NKVD of Byelorussia. Her father, Kuzma Pankevich, fought as a partisan during the Great Patriotic War falling ill and dying at over 90 years old in 1943 near his home next to the Lepel Cemetery where he had been a guard since the Revolution.

His father, Ivan Dmitrievich, was a professional Czarist army artillery officer that fought on the Southwestern Front receiving the Cross of St. George for bravery after receiving an Austrian bayonet to the chest during the Great War and, after the Russian Revolution, became a Bolshevist with the Red Guards militia as the artillery commander of Chapayev's famed division during the Russian Civil War. He met Anastasia while he was in Mikhail Tukhachevsky's Red Army campaign on Warsaw during the Polish–Soviet War. Between the establishment of the Soviet Union and the Great Patriotic War, they lived in various places in Byelorussia, Ukraine, and Russia including Minsk and Kharkiv. Conscripted into the Red Army on December 17, 1942, from Yerakhtur or Erakhtur in the Ryazan Oblast, Ivan Dmitrievich fought with distinction during the Great Patriotic War in the victorious 5th Red Army on the 3rd Belorussian Front receiving the Medal "For Valor" for actions taken on March 2, 1945, to capture the Wehrmacht's center of defenses by destroying three German submachine gunners with grenades. He spent one and a half years recovering from a bullet wound to his lungs. Later, he became the chief of staff of the military department at the Kazan University. He and his wife spent their final years in Kazan where he first started his military career.

Career
In 1940, Yuri Ivanovich began his military training at the 14th Special Artillery School in Kharkiv where his father had been on the faculty since 1937. When the war began, he evacuated to Aktyubinsk to work at a tank repair plant. He was only 17 when he graduated from school in June 1943 and entered the Red Army in July 1943 for military training at the Red Army Military Technical Academy (the Leningrad Artillery School known today as Mikhailovskaya Military Artillery Academy. During the Great Patriotic War, he was a Lieutenant on the 1st Belorussian Front and commanded a fire platoon of an anti-tank battalion under the command of famed Nestor Kozin in the 52nd Guards Rifle Division which victoriously entered Berlin in the spring of 1945. He served with distinction receiving the Order of the Red Star. Following the War, he continued his service with the Red Army and later the Soviet Army in Germany and the Baltics. In 1952, Drozdov began his studies of German and English at the Soviet Army's Military Institute of Foreign Languages in Moscow and then, in 1956, graduated as a German and English linguist and transferred to the KGB.

In the spring of 1957 until August, he began his illegals career posing as a Silesian in Leipzig and then transferred to Berlin where he, under Alexander Mikhailovich Korotkov, the KGB commander in the GDR, was a KGB liaison officer to the Stasi, living in West Berlin to increase his fluency and become more convincing in his alias. He had several roles as an illegal including the violent SS man Baron Hoenshtein, who received valuable intelligence information from his connections, and then as Inspector Kleinert, who obtained cover documents for other Soviet illegals. This was merely the beginning of the most illustrious person in the history of the KGB's First Chief Directorate.

On Glienicke Bridge between Potsdam and Berlin during the February 10, 1962, prisoner exchange of Francis Gary Powers, who had been shot down during the 1960 U-2 incident, and KGB Colonel Vilyam Genrikhovich "Willie" Fisher (alias Rudolf Abel), who had been convicted of espionage activities against the West during the Hollow Nickel Case, Drozdov (alias Jurgen Drews, Abel's purported German cousin) facilitated the transfer with Abel's attorney, James B. Donovan. The classic 1968 Soviet film, The Shield and the Sword depicting the prisoner exchange, inspired Russian President Vladimir Putin to join the KGB.

In 1963, he returned to Moscow for graduate studies. In 1964-1968 during the Cultural Revolution, he served as the KGB resident in Communist China which also was a time of increased Sino-Soviet tensions. In New York in 1975–1979, he became the Soviet Union's deputy representative to the United Nations as the KGB resident.

Paving the way for the Soviet invasion of Afghanistan in 1979 as the new KGB Chief of Directorate S, he led the 43 minute Special Operation Storm-333 beginning at 7:30pm on Friday, December 27, 1979, in which KGB forces stormed the Afghan presidential palace replacing President Hafizullah Amin with their own puppet Babrak Karmal. This action was the beginning phase of the Soviet Union's protracted Soviet Union-Afghanistan War (1979-1987). He led the Directorate S until 1991 establishing Vympel within the KGB's First Chief Directorate as a dedicated spetsnaz unit that specialized in deep penetration, sabotage, universal direct and covert action, protection of Soviet embassies and espionage cell activation in case of war.

After his resignation from the KGB, he worked for his company, Namakon (Namacon in the West), to provide security and logistics to foreign businessmen, political analysis, and finding office space and performing background checks for Western businesses in Russia.

Personal life

Drozdov met his wife, the former Lyudmila Yudenich, during World War II. He was a member of the Russian Orthodox Church and owned an icon of Tsar Nicholas II, acquired at some point following the Fall of Communism. He died in Moscow on 21 June 2017 and was buried with military honors at the Troyekurovskoye Cemetery.

Awards and decorations
Soviet Union and Russia

Honorary State Security Officer
jubilee medals

Foreign

government awards of Cuba

Books he authored 

Fartishev, Vasily, and Drozdov, Yuri. Юрий Андропов и Владимир Путин. На пути к возрождению in Russian. translated title: Yuri Andropov and Vladimir Putin: on the path for revitalizing. Moscow. Olma Press. 2001. 352 pages. .

Notes

References 

1925 births
2017 deaths
KGB officers
Soviet military personnel of World War II
Soviet military personnel of the Soviet–Afghan War
Russian Orthodox Christians from Russia
Military personnel from Minsk
Recipients of the Order of Lenin
Recipients of the Order of the Red Banner
Recipients of the Medal of Zhukov
Recipients of the Order of the Red Banner of Labour
Recipients of the Order of the Red Star
Burials in Troyekurovskoye Cemetery
Soviet expatriates in China
Soviet major generals